Garabed Sarkis "Garo" Yepremian (June 2, 1944 – May 15, 2015) was a Cypriot-Armenian American football placekicker who played in the National Football League (NFL) for 15 seasons, primarily with the Miami Dolphins. During his nine seasons in Miami, Yepremian was named to two Pro Bowls, twice received first-team All-Pro honors, and helped the Dolphins win two Super Bowl titles. Yepremian's first championship victory in Super Bowl VII occurred as a member of the 1972 Dolphins, the only team to complete a perfect season in NFL history. He also played for the Detroit Lions, New Orleans Saints, and Tampa Bay Buccaneers before retiring in 1981.

Garo Yepremian is regarded as the greatest kicker in Dolphins history.

Early years
Yepremian was born in Larnaca, Cyprus, to Armenian parents.

Yepremian and his brother, Krikor, who attended Indiana University on a soccer scholarship, immigrated to the United States. Yepremian, who had earlier played in an organized soccer league in London, was not eligible to play NCAA football. After watching some of a football game on television, he decided to pursue an NFL career. With Krikor acting as his agent, he earned a contract with the Detroit Lions.

Professional career
Yepremian signed with the Detroit Lions on October 13, 1966.  In his rookie year, he broke an American football record by kicking six field goals in a single game against the Minnesota Vikings on November 13. His talent aside, Yepremian was, nonetheless, at a loss regarding football vernacular and custom. In his first game his coach told him that their team had lost the coin toss, at which point Yepremian ran to midfield and dropped to his knees looking for the coin.

Yepremian was an immediate target to NFL players who considered American football the exclusive realm of Americans. Players were looking to take Yepremian's head off, and before his first kickoff his coach told him to run to the bench as soon as he kicked before his opponents could lay into him. Yepremian kicked off, then in a harried state ran to the wrong bench, finding himself sitting with the opposing team who while laughing then picked him up and threw him back onto the field. Yepremian had never worn a helmet and at first decided not to use one with a face mask, but that changed during Week 4 of the 1966 season, when he was knocked to the ground, roughed up and badly injured by Green Bay Packers linebacker Ray Nitschke. Afterwards, he started using a single-bar mask. He was the last player in the NFL to not wear a facemask on his helmet.

During one of his early games with the Lions, they were losing but scored a touchdown in the last 10 seconds of the game. Yepremian was sent in to kick the extra point, and he was so excited after converting the point that he went running off the field with his arms raised in celebration. Teammate Alex Karras asked Yepremian, "What the hell are you celebrating?" Yepremian replied with a phrase made famous on The Tonight Show Starring Johnny Carson: "I keek (kick) a touchdown".

After the 1967 season, Yepremian left football to enlist in the U.S. Army. When he returned to the Detroit area in 1968, however, the Lions chose not to re-sign him, so Yepremian signed a contract to be a kicker/punter for the Michigan Arrows of the Continental Football League. The Arrows, however, were a disaster on the field (1-11) and at the gate (drawing barely 4,000 fans a game in Detroit) and folded at season's end.

After sitting out the 1969 season, Yepremian earned a spot on the Dolphins roster in 1970. He led the NFL with 117 points in 1971, and in Super Bowl VI, he scored the only 3 Dolphin points vs the Cowboys. The next year, he was a key member of the 1972 Miami Dolphins "Perfect Season" team - he was the leading scorer and converted on many clutch field goals to help the Dolphins stay unbeaten. Yepremian appeared in three Super Bowls (VI, VII, and VIII).

Yepremian went to the New Orleans Saints for the 1979 season, signed after their 1979 first round draft choice, Russell Erxleben (who was handling all kicking chores), suffered a season-ending injury prior to the Saints' week two game with the Green Bay Packers. In 14 games, he made 12 of 16 attempts, with his longest being from 44 yards. He spent his final two years with the Tampa Bay Buccaneers. He made 16 of 23 for 1980, his lowest field goal rate since making only 45% in 1977. For 1981, he went 2 for 4 to end his career as he was replaced by Bill Capece.

Over his career, Yepremian was successful on 210 of 313 field goals and 444 of 464 extra points for a total of 1,074 points. He led the league in field-goal accuracy three times.  Garo and kick returner Rick Upchurch are the only first-team members of the 1970s NFL All-Decade team to not be elected to the Pro Football Hall of Fame.

Highlights
Yepremian is best known for two feats — one famous and one infamous. In a divisional playoff game against the Kansas City Chiefs on Christmas 1971, he kicked a 37-yard field goal 7 minutes and 40 seconds into double overtime, ending the longest game in NFL history and sending the Dolphins to the AFC Championship game against the Baltimore Colts (which the Dolphins won to go on to Super Bowl VI).

Despite all of Yepremian's success, many people remember him for a play in Super Bowl VII in 1973. With his team leading the Washington Redskins 14–0, Yepremian was sent on to the field to kick a field goal with slightly more than two minutes left, which would have put the game out of reach. The field goal attempt was blocked by Bill Brundige, and Yepremian managed to get to the ball before any other player did. Because Garo feared injury from a pile on, instead of just falling on the ball to preserve the Dolphins' 14–0 lead, he picked it up and frantically attempted to throw a pass with Brundige bearing down on Garo and growling at him. As a result, the ball slipped from Garo’s hands and went straight up in the air. Yepremian then attempted to bat the ball out of bounds but instead batted it back up in the air, and it went right into the arms of his former Lions teammate, Redskins cornerback Mike Bass, who returned it for a touchdown. The Dolphins managed to hold on to win, 14–7, thus completing the Dolphins' undefeated 1972 season. Yepremian later joked to reporters after the game, "This is the first time the goat of the game is in the winners' locker room."

In the 1973 Pro Bowl, Yepremian kicked five field goals to lead the AFC to a win, and was voted Most Valuable Player in that game. He was elected to another Pro Bowl in 1978, and he kicked 20 consecutive field goals without a miss in 1979.

Accolades
 Voted "Kicker of the Decade" (1970s) by the Pro Football Hall of Fame Committee
 Named to Sports Illustrateds “Dr. Z's All Decade 1970s Team"
 Two Pro Bowl appearances
 Two First-team All-Pro honors
 Led NFL in total scoring in the 1970s decade with 905 points
 Elected to the Florida Sports Hall of Fame in 1982
 Nominated for the Pro Football Hall of Fame
 Leading scorer of the Miami Dolphins Undefeated 1972 17-0 Super Bowl VII team and 1973 Super Bowl VIII team
 Ended the longest game in pro football history- 1971 Miami Dolphins vs Kansas City Chiefs AFC Divisional Playoff Game
 Named one of the Miami Dolphins all-time 40 greatest players as part of the Dolphins' 40th Anniversary, 2005
 Longest NFL career (14 seasons) for any player who did not play football in college
 Inducted into the American Football Association's Semi Pro Football Hall of Fame in 1988
 Named one of the Miami Dolphins all-time 50 greatest players as part of the Dolphins' 50th Anniversary, 2015

Personal life
Yepremian was a motivational speaker and was the Founder/CEO of the Garo Yepremian Foundation for Brain Tumor Research.

Reebok featured Yepremian and his teammates from the 1972 Dolphins team in a commercial which aired during Super Bowl XLII.

He guest starred in an episode of The Odd Couple in 1974 called "The Rain in Spain Falls Mainly In Vain".

Garo appeared in the movie Paper Lion as himself.

Death

Yepremian died on the morning of May 15, 2015, from high grade neuroendocrine cancer at the age of 70.  He is interred at the Oaklands Cemetery in West Chester, Pennsylvania.

References

Other sources
 Carroll, Bob, et al. (1999). Total Football II. New York: HarperCollins.

External links
 
 Official Garo Yepremian Facebook Page

1944 births
2015 deaths
American Conference Pro Bowl players
American football placekickers
American people of Armenian descent
Burials at Oaklands Cemetery
Butler University alumni
Continental Football League players
Cypriot emigrants to the United States
Cypriot people of Armenian descent
Cypriot players of American football
Deaths from brain cancer in the United States
Deaths from neuroendocrine cancer
Detroit Lions players
Ethnic Armenian sportspeople
Miami Dolphins players
New Orleans Saints players
People from Larnaca
Players of American football from Pennsylvania
Sportspeople from Delaware County, Pennsylvania
Tampa Bay Buccaneers players
United States Army soldiers